Odysseus on the island of the Phaecians is a landscape painting by Peter Paul Rubens, dating to around 1630–1635. It shows Nausicaa and her maids discovering Odysseus on Phaecia. It is now in the Galleria Palatina in Florence.

History
The work was first recorded in 1677 in the duke of Richelieu's collection as a view of the city of Cadiz. It passed from there into the Habsburg collection and arrived in Florence in 1765. It was taken to Paris by the French between March and April 1799 and remained in France until 1815.

External links
http://www.polomuseale.firenze.it/catalogo/scheda.asp?nctn=00129509&value=1

1635 paintings
Mythological paintings by Peter Paul Rubens
Paintings in the collection of the Galleria Palatina
Paintings depicting Greek myths
Landscape paintings
Paintings based on the Odyssey